Milkesa Mengesha (born 16 April 2000) is an Ethiopian athlete.

He won gold in the 2019 IAAF World Cross Country Championships – Junior men's race in Aarhus.

In June 21 he shaved 27 seconds off his personal best in the 5000m going from 13:25.74 to 12:58.28 as he finished third in the Ethiopian Olympic trials behind Nibret Melak and Getnet Wale and secured his place at the delayed 2020 Tokyo Olympics.

Personal bests
Outdoor
3000 metres – 7:49.23 (Oslo 2019)
5000 metres – 12:58.28 (Hengelo 2021)
10000 metres – 27:00.24 (Hengelo 2022)
Road
10 kilometres – 27:47 (Dongio 2019)
Half marathon – 58:58 (København 2022)

References

2000 births
Living people
Ethiopian male long-distance runners
Athletes (track and field) at the 2020 Summer Olympics
Olympic athletes of Ethiopia
21st-century Ethiopian people